Mouhijärvi is a former municipality of Finland, located in the southwestern part of the country. It was an agricultural village since the 18th century.

On 1 January in 2009 Mouhijärvi was consolidated with the municipalities of Vammala and Äetsä, to form a new town named Sastamala.

Geography
Mouhijärvi was located in the southwest Pirkanmaa region, and was part of the former provinces of Turku and Pori Province (1917 to 1997) and  Western Finland Province  (1997 to 2010).

Demographics
The municipality had a population of 2,961 (2003). The population density was 11.0 inhabitants per .

The municipality was unilingually Finnish.

History
Mouhijärvi was notable for being the first municipality in Finland to have an all-female city council — in 1988.

People born in Mouhijärvi
Emil Viljanen (1874 – 1954)
Markku Aro (1950 – )

See also
South Western Pirkanmaa

References

External links 

Map of Mouhijärvi area
Panoramio: Mouhijärvi environs image gallery
Historic Mouhijärvi parish info

Sastamala
Former municipalities of Finland
Populated places disestablished in 2009
2009 disestablishments in Finland